Jung Byung-tak (1942 – 11 February 2016) was a South Korean footballer and football manager.
He was a member of Korean national football team in the 1960s. He was former Korean national football team manager and first manager of Chunnam Dragons

References

External links 
 FIFA Player Statistics

South Korean footballers
South Korean football managers
Jeonnam Dragons managers
1942 births
2016 deaths
Association football forwards